Tamara Malešev (born January 8, 1967, in Novi Sad) is a retired Serbian  track and field athlete who competed in the long jump and high jump. She competed at the 1992 Summer Olympics in Barcelona as an Independent Olympic Participant.

She holds the Serbian indoor record in high jump.

References
Sports-Reference.com

Living people
1967 births
Sportspeople from Novi Sad
Yugoslav female long jumpers
Yugoslav female high jumpers
Serbian female long jumpers
Serbian female high jumpers
Olympic athletes as Independent Olympic Participants
Athletes (track and field) at the 1992 Summer Olympics
Mediterranean Games gold medalists for Yugoslavia
Athletes (track and field) at the 1991 Mediterranean Games
Mediterranean Games medalists in athletics